Zala is a surname of Slovene origin. Notable people with the surname include:

Boris Zala (born 1954), Slovak politician
György Zala (canoeist) (born 1969), Hungarian sprint canoer
György Zala (sculptor) (1858-1937), Hungarian sculptor
Nick Zala (born 1959), English guitarist

Fictional character
Athrun Zala, a fictional character in the anime Gundam SEED and Gundam SEED DESTINY